The 2022 season was Melaka United Football Club's 98th season in club history and 6th season in the Malaysia Super League.

Players

First-team squad

Squad statistics

Appearances 

|-
|colspan="17"|Players who left the club during the season
|-
|}

Competitions

Malaysia Super League

Malaysia FA Cup

References

Melaka United F.C.
Melaka United F.C. seasons
Melaka United
Malaysian football club seasons by club